Nahal Amud, also known as the Wadi al-Amud, is a stream in the Upper Galilee region of Israel that flows into the Sea of Galilee.

History

The source of the stream, Ramat Dalton, is located 800 meters above sea level. Its drainage basin includes the peaks of Mount Canaan (955 meters) and Mount Meron (1,204 meters) and flows south through eastern Galilee to the northwest part of the Sea of Galilee – a height of less than 200 meters below sea level.

The stream is named after a pillar that rises high above ground and is located near a channel of the stream near Kibbutz Hukok. The gorge that forms the channel at this point holds many caves once inhabited by Homo heidelbergensis and later by Neanderthal Man such as the cave at Zuttiyeh and the Amud cave. They were the object of the first paleoanthropological excavations in Mandatory Palestine in 1925–1926. The caves contained hominin remains as well as Mousterian and Acheulean artifacts.

Most of Nahal Amud (8923 dunams) was declared a nature reserve in 1972.

See also
Geography of Israel
Hiking in Israel
Archaeology of Israel
Amud 1

References

External links 

 Amud stream @ eretz.com

Rivers of Israel
Nature reserves in Israel
Archaeological sites in Israel
Prehistoric sites in Israel
Protected areas of Northern District (Israel)
Neanderthal sites
Sea of Galilee
Galilee